Anna Gifty Opoku-Agyeman (born 1996) is a Ghanaian-born American activist and writer. She is a co-founder and former CEO of the Sadie Collective, as well as a co-founder and co-organizer of Black Birders Week.

Early life and education
Opoku-Agyeman was born in Kumasi, Ghana, and moved to the United States as a child.

Opoku-Agyeman graduated from St. John's Parish Day School in Ellicott City, Maryland in 2007, and from Glenelg Country School, also in Ellicott City, in 2014. In 2019, she earned a B.A. in mathematics with a minor in economics from the University of Maryland, Baltimore County (UMBC). As an undergraduate, Opoku-Agyeman was a Meyerhoff Scholar and NIH MARC U*STAR Scholar, and was enrolled in the UMBC Honors College.

After graduating from college, Opoku-Agyeman attended the American Economic Association’s summer training program, which aims to increase diversity in economics "by preparing talented undergraduates for doctoral programs in economics and related disciplines". She then spent the 2019–2020 academic year enrolled in the Harvard University Research Scholar Initiative postbaccalaureate program. While Opoku-Agyeman was in the Harvard postbaccalaureate program, she was a research assistant to an economics professor at Harvard Graduate School of Education and was affiliated with the National Bureau of Economic Research. She is currently a doctoral student in Public Policy and Economics at the Harvard Kennedy School as a National Science Foundation Graduate Research Fellow, a Ford Foundation Graduate Fellow, and a Women and Public Policy Program Doctoral Fellow.

Career

The Sadie Collective
In 2018, Opoku-Agyeman and Fanta Traore co-founded a nonprofit organization called the Sadie Collective, which aims to increase the number of Black women working in quantitative data fields, including economics, data science, and public policy. The collective offers mentorship and hosts programming, including the annual Sadie Tanner Mossell Alexander Conference for Economics and Related Fields. Opoku-Agyeman served as the CEO of the organization until March 2021. Several of her published works and media features, which advocate for the advancement and inclusion of black women in economics, have been the result of collaboration with Lisa D. Cook, a Professor of Economics and International Relations at Michigan State University.

Black Birders Week
In 2020, Opoku-Agyeman co-founded and co-organized Black Birders Week, a series of online events organized to highlight and celebrate Black birders, naturalists, and outdoor enthusiasts. Her aim was to improve the visibility of Black people in non-stereotypical situations, and to advocate for science organizations to give Black people the platform and resources to engage in engagement and outreach activities. Additionally, the inaugural Black Birders Week produced content in collaboration with the National Audubon Society and the Monterey Bay Aquarium.

Publications

Academic publications

Selected other publications
 "The Black Agenda: Bold Solutions for a Broken System," Edited by Anna Gifty Opoku-Agyeman, with foreword by Tressie McMillan Cottom and essayists including Dr. Sandy Darity, Dr. Hedwig Lee, Mary Heglar, and Janelle Jones.

References

External links 
 

1996 births
Birdwatchers
Living people
21st-century American non-fiction writers
21st-century American essayists
21st-century American women writers
Ghanaian emigrants to the United States
People from Kumasi
University of Maryland, Baltimore County alumni
21st-century Ghanaian women writers
Ghanaian non-fiction writers